The following are the national records in athletics in Bermuda maintained by its national athletics federation: Bermuda National Athletics Association (BNAA).

Outdoor

Key to tables:

ht = hand timing

A = affected by altitude

# = not ratified by federation

OT = oversized track (> 200m in circumference)

y = denotes 440 yards

mx = mixed race

Men

Women

Indoor

Men

Women

Notes

References
General
Bermudian Outdoor Records 16 June 2019 updated
Bermudian Indoor Records 21 February 2019 updated
Bermudian Road Running Records - Men
Bermudian Road Running Records - Men
Specific

External links
BNAA web site

Bermuda
Athletics
Athletics